Qaleh Ali Morad Khan (also Romanized as Qalʿeh ʿAlī Morād Khān) is a village in Koregah-e Gharbi Rural District, in the Central District of Khorramabad County, Lorestan Province, Iran. At the 2006 census, its population was 20, in 5 families.

References 

Towns and villages in Khorramabad County